This table shows an overview of the protected heritage sites in the Walloon town Lontzen. This list is part of Belgium's national heritage.

|}

See also 
 Lists of protected heritage sites in the German-speaking Community of Belgium
 List of protected heritage sites in Liège (province)
Lontzen

References
 Belgian heritage register: Direction générale opérationnelle - Aménagement du territoire, Logement, Patrimoine et Energie (DG4)
 www.dglive.be
 Geschützte Objekte in Lontzen

Lontzen
Lontzen